Smash is the debut studio album by Jackson and His Computerband. It was released via Warp in 2005.

Critical reception
At Metacritic, which assigns a weighted average score out of 100 to reviews from mainstream critics, the album received an average score of 66% based on 5 reviews, indicating "generally favorable reviews".

Track listing

Personnel
Credits adapted from liner notes.

 Jackson and His Computerband – production, mixing (1, 2, 3, 4, 8, 9, 10, 11, 12, 14)
 Paula Moore – vocals (1, 2, 5, 13)
 Harper Smith – vocals (5)
 Mike Ladd – vocals (6)
 Steve Arguelles – timpani (3, 5), snare drum (3, 5)
 Tim Paris – final assistance (3)
 Quentin Dupieux – mixing (5, 7)
 Stephane 'Alf' Briat – mixing (6, 13)
 Chab – mastering
 Jean-Pierre – mastering
 Jean Sebastién – mastering assistance
 Egospray – art direction, design, photography
 Mick Jayet – photography
 John Sack – illustration, graphics
 Reach – visual assistance

Charts

References

External links
 

2005 debut albums
Jackson and His Computerband albums
Warp (record label) albums